Sarabande and Danse is a ballet choreographed by John Clifford to Debussy's Sarabande (1901) and Danse (1890). The premiere took place on 21 May 1970, with New York City Ballet at the  New York State Theater, Lincoln Center.

Original cast 

Johnna Kirkland
Earle Sieveling
Violette Verdy
John Clifford

References

Ballets by John Clifford
Ballets to the music of Claude Debussy
1970 ballet premieres
New York City Ballet repertory